Caterpillar is an album by Italian singer Mina, issued in 1991.

In the first CD, Mina covers old hits, originally published between 1927 (Hoagy Carmichael's "Stardust") and 1979 (Gianna Nannini's "California").

Track listing

CD 1

CD 2

1991 albums
Mina (Italian singer) albums